The 1910 Nebraska Cornhuskers football team represented the University of Nebraska as a member of the Missouri Valley Conference (MVC) during the 1910 college football season. The team was coached by fourth-year head coach William C. "King" Cole and played its home games at Nebraska Field in Lincoln, Nebraska.

The Cornhuskers won the MVC championship, the school's first since 1907. After the season, the conference adopted a new rule prohibiting "special coaching" and requiring that athletic coaches be full-time faculty members. Unwilling to commit to a year-round position, Cole resigned and moved to his farm in Missoula, Montana. His final game at Nebraska was a record-setting 119–0 win over Haskell.

Schedule

Coaching staff

Roster

Game summaries

Peru State

Sources:

This was the final meeting between Nebraska and Peru State.

South Dakota

Sources:

at Minnesota

Sources:

Denver

Sources:

This was the final meeting between Denver and Nebraska.

Doane

Sources:

at Kansas

Sources:

Nebraska clinched at least a share of the MVIAA championship with a 6–0 win over Kansas.

Iowa State

Sources:

Nebraska clinched the conference title outright with a 24–0 win over Iowa State, NU's fourth consecutive shutout.

Haskell

Sources:

In Cole's final game as head coach, Nebraska set several program records in a 119–0 blowout of Haskell. Among the marks that still stand are points scored, margin of victory, and yards of offense (1,150). The Indians managed only 67 yards in their 17 total plays in the game.

References

Nebraska
Nebraska Cornhuskers football seasons
Missouri Valley Conference football champion seasons
Nebraska Cornhuskers football